The San Boldo Pass (in Italian Passo San Boldo, formerly Passo Sant'Ubaldo and Umbaldopass) is a small mountain pass in Veneto between the towns of Trichiana [] and Tovena in the Cison di Valmarino region [] over a distance of .

The mountain pass is called the SP 635 and only one lane is passable, the traffic is regulated by several sets of lights. There are five tunnels blasted into the rock with hairpin turns or loops, and six bridges.

History
Although the need to rebuild the steep road over the San Boldo pass into a motorable road was clear by the end of the 19th century, this project languished until the Austro-Hungarian army accomplished it from February to June 1918 as part of its  World War I logistical efforts. The road to supply the Piave front was built in only three months. Due to its short construction period, it is nicknamed the "Road of 100 Days." Prisoners of war, the elderly, women, and children of the local population were pressed into service to build it. In its final construction phase, 1,400 workers worked in three shifts to build this strategically important connection. Despite the extreme topography, the requirement that the road be used for transporting heavy artillery and supplies meant that the grade could not exceed 12%.

References

External

 information and map for Tovena, Italy
 WikiMapia content for San Boldo Pass

Landforms of Veneto
Mountain passes of Italy
Transport in Veneto